Kamar Zard (also Romanized as Kamar-e Zard; also known as Kamar-e Zard-e Rāmjerd and Kamar Zard Ramjerd) is a village in Majdabad Rural District, in the Central District of Marvdasht County, Fars Province, Iran. At the 2006 census, its population was 354, in 74 families.

References 

Populated places in Marvdasht County